Fellwock Garage, also known as Glass Specialty Company, is a historic commercial building located in downtown Evansville, Indiana.  It was designed by the architecture firm Harris & Shopbell Co. and built in 1908.

It was listed on the National Register of Historic Places in 1984.

References

Commercial buildings on the National Register of Historic Places in Indiana
Commercial buildings completed in 1908
Buildings and structures in Evansville, Indiana
National Register of Historic Places in Evansville, Indiana
1908 establishments in Indiana
Transportation buildings and structures in Vanderburgh County, Indiana